The 2018 South American Women's Cricket Championship was held in Colombia from 23 to 26 August. The four teams that participated this year were the women's sides of Brazil, Chile, Mexico and Peru. This was the first time in the tournament's history that the matches were recognized as official WT20I games as the ICC granted WT20I status to all matches played between the associate teams from 1 July 2018. All participating teams made their WT20I debuts during the tournament (except for Peru who included some unqualified 'guest' players in their squad and hence their matches were not granted WT20I status). All matches were played on two fields of the Los Pinos Polo Club in Mosquera, near Bogotá. Brazil won the tournament by registering a comprehensive win over Chile in the final.

Squads

Round-robin

Points table

Matches

Final

Notes

See also
 2018 South American Cricket Championship – Men's tournament

References

Women's South American Cricket Championship
Cricket in South America
Cricket in Colombia
Cricket in Brazil
Cricket in Mexico
Cricket in Chile